Fafsula is a settlement in Garissa County, Kenya, just north of Arawale National Reserve.

Populated places in North Eastern Province (Kenya)
Garissa County